Heatherwood Hospital is an NHS hospital in Ascot, Berkshire. It is managed by Frimley Health NHS Foundation Trust.

History
The hospital has its origins in a Victorian country residence known as “Heatherfield” built in 1876, possibly for the Farrar family (whose motto 'Ferre va Ferme' appears over the front door). It was in the ownership of the Ponsonby family between 1881 and 1891, when the Hon. Ashley Ponsonby, a Justice of the Peace and cousin of Sir Henry Ponsonby, Equerry to Queen Victoria, and his family had their country seat there.

By 1900 the estate was known as Heatherwood and had been acquired by Sir Thomas Lucas, Bt., the son of Thomas Lucas, one of the founders of Lucas Brothers, the builders. The estate was offered for sale at auction by Messers Chancellor and Sons in 1906, but initially failed to find a purchaser. The house and estate was eventually acquired by the United Services Fund (possibly in 1919 when the estate was again offered for sale at auction but more likely in 1920 when it was sold by private treaty by Hamptons).

The United Services Fund converted the building into a hospital for the children of ex-servicemen from the First World War. Patients were admitted from 1922 and the new hospital was officially opened by the Duke of Connaught in May 1923. The new facility specialised in the treatment of children suffering from tuberculosis and orthopaedic diseases. The hospital joined the National Health Service in 1948 and new accident and emergency, out-patient, physiotherapy and hydrotherapy facilities were opened by the Princess Royal in 1961. A new maternity department opened in 1972 and a new mental health and elderly health unit was opened by Princess Anne in 1988.

Following cut-backs, the birth unit closed in September 2011 and the minor injuries unit closed in January 2014.

A new hospital building with six operating theatres, 48 inpatient beds and facilities for 22 day cases, was constructed on a site close to the Ascot Stables and completed in April 2022. The former hospital will be demolished, with a new housing development built on the site.

Film location
The former Heatherwood Hospital was used as the exterior of "Finisham Maternity Hospital" in Carry On Matron (1972).

See also
 List of hospitals in England

Notes

References

External links
 Heatherwood Hospital
 Heatherwood Hospital History
 League of Friends Heatherwood Heritage Group

Hospital buildings completed in 1922
Hospitals in Berkshire
NHS hospitals in England
Sunninghill and Ascot